The New York Medical Times was a monthly medical journal published by E.P. Coby & Co. published between 1881 and 1896 and edited by Dr. Egbert Guernsey.

Another journal of the same name was published between 1851 and 1856.

History
The Medical Union published two volumes in New York City from January, 1873, with Egbert Guernsey as the editor. In the same period, the New York Journal of Homœopathy was established by the New York Homeopathic Medical College, edited by William Tod Helmuth and T. F. Allen as editors of volume one, and Dr. Samuel A. Jones as the general editor of volume two.  Both journals were consolidated into Homœopathic Times in 1875, which published a volume three under the editorship of Drs. Egbert Guernsey, Alfred K. Hills and J. B. Gilbert and continued until 1881, when it became the New York Medical Times, with homœopathy being no longer being included.

References

External links 

Healthcare in New York City
1880s in New York City
Publications disestablished in 1886
Publications established in 1881
General medical journals
1881 establishments in New York (state)